The 2019 Indian general election in Uttar Pradesh was held  between 11 April and 19 May 2019 to constitute the 17th Lok Sabha. The election results were declared on 23 May which saw the BJP led Alliance winning majority of seats.

Opinion Poll

Exit Polls

Results

Constituency Wise Results

Assembly segments wise lead of Parties

Candidates

Region-Wise Results

See also 

 Elections in Uttar Pradesh
 Politics of Uttar Pradesh
 2019 Indian general election
 17th Lok Sabha
 List of members of the 17th Lok Sabha

References

External links
Uttar Pradesh constituencies wise parliamentary election detail results 2019

Indian general elections in Uttar Pradesh
Uttar Pradesh